Vassilis Vassilikos (born 18 November 1934) is a Greek writer and diplomat.

Biography
He was born in Kavala to parents native to the island of Thasos. His father was an MP with the Liberal Party. He grew up in Thessaloniki, graduated from law school there, and moved to Athens to work as a journalist.

Because of his political activities, he was forced into exile for seven years, following the coup of 1967.

From 1981 to 1984, Vassilikos served as the director of the Greek state television channel (ET1). Since 1996, he has served as Greece's ambassador to UNESCO.

Work
As an author, Vassilikos has been highly prolific and widely translated. He has published more than 100 books, including novels, plays and poetry. His best-known work is the political novel Z (1967), which has been translated into 32 languages and was the basis of the award-winning film Z directed by Costa-Gavras (with music by Mikis Theodorakis). It also inspired the Indian film 'Shanghai' which released to critical acclaim.

Vassilikos and his late wife Dimitra (Mimí) were friends with the American poet James Merrill; the death of Mimí serves as a critical late plot turn in Merrill's epic poem, The Changing Light at Sandover (1982).

In the United States, Vassilikos has long been associated with and published by Seven Stories Press.

Politics
He ran in the 2014 Greek local elections as a PASOK candidate for counsellor in the city of Athens.

In the 2019 Greek legislative election, he was elected MP with Syriza.

Selected bibliography
 The Monarch
 And Dreams Are Dreams
 The Photographs
 The Plant, the Well, the Angel
 The Coroner's Assistant
 The Harpoon Gun
 The Few Things I Know About Glafkos Thrassakis
 Z (English language  or )

Translations
 The Photographs, tr. M. Edwards (1971; repr. 1972)
 The Plant, The Well, The Angel A Trilogy, tr. E. Keeley, M. Keeley (1964)

References

External links
Vassilikos' home page
Vassilikos' poems from Translatum's anthology of Poets from Thessaloniki

1934 births
Living people
People from Thasos
People from Kavala
Greek diplomats
Greek democracy activists
Greek journalists
20th-century Greek novelists
20th-century Greek poets
Modern Greek-language writers
Permanent Delegates of Greece to UNESCO
Greek male poets
20th-century Greek male writers
Greek MPs 2019–2023
Syriza politicians